Princess Faika (8 June 1926 – 7 January 1983) was an Egyptian royal and a member of the Muhammad Ali Dynasty.

Early life
Faika Sadek was born at the Ras al Tin Palace, Alexandria, on 8 June 1926. She was one of the daughters of King Fuad I and Nazli Sabri and the sister of King Farouk, Princess Fawzia, Princess Faiza and Princess Fathia. Her maternal great-grandfather was Major-General Muhammad Sharif Pasha, prime minister and minister of foreign affairs, who was of Turkish origin.

Personal life
Faika married Fouad Sadek, a commoner Egyptian and a consular officer, in a civil ceremony on 5 April 1950 in San Francisco. At first, King Farouk did not endorse the marriage, but later he confirmed it. Then they married in a religious ceremony at the Kubba Palace in Cairo on 4 June 1950. Faika's husband was given the title of "bey" after the marriage. The couple lived in the Dokki Palace on the Nile and Fouad Sadek began to work at the foreign ministry of Egypt. They had four children, two daughters and two sons.

Death
Faika died in Cairo on 7 January 1983 at the age of 56 following a long illness.

Honours
  Decoration of Al Kemal in brilliants.

Ancestry

References

External links

20th-century Egyptian women
1926 births
1983 deaths
Daughters of kings
Egyptian Muslims
Egyptian people of Albanian descent
Egyptian people of Circassian descent
Egyptian people of French descent
Egyptian people of Turkish descent
Egyptian princesses
Faika